Pratidin may refer to—

Media 
 Asomiya Pratidin, Assamese-language newspaper from India
 Bangladesh Pratidin, Bangla-language newspaper from Bangladesh
 Pratidin Time, an Assamese-language news channel

Films 
 Ek Din Pratidin, a 1979 Indian Bengali film